North Dum Dum Municipality or Uttar Dum Dum Paurasabha is a municipality of North 24 Parganas district in the Indian state of West Bengal. It responsible for the civic infrastructure and administration of the city of North Dum Dum. It currently has 34 wards each represented by a councillor.

Administration
Chairman : Bidhan Biswas

Vice Chairman : Lopamudra Dutta Chowdhury

Chairman-in-Council :
 Soumen Dutta	 
 Bindu Madhav Das	 
 Debasish Ghosh	 
 Mahua Sil	 
 Basanti Dey Biswas

Councillors
Ward No.1 ● Debashish Ghosh ● AITC /

Ward No.2 ● Rita Adhikary ● AITC /

Ward No.3 ● Pinku Kr. Bhowmick ● AITC /

Ward No.4 ● Sultana Banu ● AITC /

Ward No.5 ● Mita Das Kar ● AITC /

Ward No.6 ● Soumita Das Roy ● AITC /

Ward No.7 ● Tapash Kar ● AITC /

Ward No.8 ● Nila Mitra ● AITC /

Ward No.9 ● Basanti Dey Biswas ● AITC /

Ward No.10 ● Bindu Madhab Das ● AITC /

Ward No.11 ● Lisha Ghosh ● AITC /

Ward No.12 ● Soumen Dutta ● AITC /

Ward No.13 ● Prasanta Saha ● AITC /

Ward No.14 ● Shelly Halder ● AITC /

Ward No.15 ● Sandhya Rani Mondol ● CPIM /

Ward No.16 ● Ashok Kr. Biswas ● AITC /

Ward No.17 ● Mahua Sil ● AITC /

Ward No.18 ● Aditi Mukherjee ● AITC /

Ward No.19 ● Subodh Chakraborty ● AITC /

Ward No.20 ● Bina Bhowmick ● AITC /

Ward No.21 ● Anjana Bose ● AITC /

Ward No.22 ● Prodyut Kr. Boswas ● AITC /

Ward No.23 ● Sankar Das ● AITC /

Ward No.24 ● Goutam Karanjai ● AITC /

Ward No.25 ● Bidhan Biswas ● AITC /

Ward No.26 ● Sukla Chatterjee ● AITC /

Ward No.27 ● Rajarshi Basu ● AITC /

Ward No.28 ● Kalyan Kar ● AITC /

Ward No.29 ● Milu Roychowdhury ● AITC /

Ward No.30 ● Tapan Chakraborty ● AITC /

Ward No.31 ● Sujay Das ● AITC /

Ward No.32 ● Lopamudra Dutta Chowdhury ● AITC /

Ward No.33 ● Supriya Biswas ● AITC /

Ward No.21 ● Sk. Nazimuddin ● AITC /

References

Municipalities of West Bengal
North 24 Parganas district